Maria Rubert de Ventós (born 1956) is a Spanish architect, winner of the 2004 . Among other works, she was co-designer of the expansion of the Palacio de las Cortes in 1994 and was project director for the Olympic Village on Barcelona's Avinguda Diagonal. In 2011, she became the first female university professor of Urban Planning in Spain.

Education

Urban planning career

Rubert has focused on heritage, public and green spaces, mobility, and transport, especially in the cities of Barcelona, Madrid, and Cartagena, where she has designed management and layout plans. Her projects include the 1994 expansion of the Palacio de las Cortes of Madrid (meeting place of the Congress of Deputies), together with Josep Parcerisa and Joan Clos, after winning a competition where 287 proposals were presented.

She was also the project director for the Olympic Village on Barcelona's Avinguda Diagonal, the layout of the Besòs-Mar area, the 22@ Perú-Pere IV plan, the expansion project of Cartagena, and the urban center of Pineda de Mar.

She received the 2004  in the Journalistic Initiative category from the Ministry of Housing for her contributions to public knowledge and debate on subjects pertaining to the city of Barcelona.

Academic career
Maria Rubert de Ventós was appointed full professor of the ETSAB Department of Urban and Territorial Planning in 2011, becoming the country's first woman to reach that rank in the subject.

She has been a professor of urban planning at ETSAB since 1983. She performs research and teaches in the doctoral program in urban planning and in the master's degree in landscaping at the Department of Urban Planning of the Polytechnic University of Catalonia (UPC).

She has also taught at universities in the United States, Chile, Germany, and Italy.

She has been a juror for several awards, including "Racons Públics" in Alicante in 2012. In 2017, she was a juror of the 1st Manuel de Solà-Morales European Award for urban planning granted by the UPC's Barcelona Urban Planning Laboratory.

Publications
 Materials d'urbanisme (1999), Edicions ETSAB, with Josep Parcerisa
 La ciudad no es una hoja en Blanco: hechos del urbanismo (2000), Ediciones ARQ, with Josep Parcerisa
 Metro, Galaxias metropolitanas (2001), Edicions UPC, with Josep Parcerisa
 Places Porxades a Catalunya (2006), Edicions UPC, 
 Empire Corner (2008), Edicions ETSAB, 
 Pere IV: scan Poblenou Barcelona: urbanística 2 2016, la ciutat per parts (2016), Barcelona Grup de Recerca Laboratori d'Urbanisme, with Eulàlia Gómez
 Cities 2: Mediterranean (2018), Barcelona Grup de Recerca Laboratori d'Urbanisme, with Eulàlia Gómez
 Meridiana: scan Barcelona: Urbanística 2 2017, la ciutat per parts (2018), Barcelona Grup de Recerca Laboratori d'Urbanisme, with Eulàlia Gómez

References

External links

 

1956 births
20th-century Catalan architects
20th-century Spanish educators
Spanish women educators
21st-century Spanish architects
21st-century Spanish educators
21st-century Spanish women writers
Urban planners from Catalonia
Living people
Academic staff of the Polytechnic University of Catalonia
Spanish women architects
Writers from Barcelona
20th-century women educators
21st-century women educators
20th-century Spanish women